Posoqueria latifolia, the needle flower, is a tree species in the family Rubiaceae whose range stretches from southern Mexico to the Amazon Jungle in South America. It also goes by the name Boca de Vieja (mouth of the old lady) and its fruit is known as monkey apple.

References

Posoquerieae
Trees of Peru